Al Qatrana power plant (Qatrana power plant) is a natural gas-fired power plant in Al Qatrana,  south of Amman, Jordan. The generating capacity of the power plant is 373 MW. Natural gas to the plant is supplied through the Arab Gas Pipeline. .

The construction started in May 2009 and the power plant was inaugurated on 27 February 2012.  It cost about US$500 million. The power plant was constructed by Korea Electric Power Corporation, who received a right to operate the power plant until 2035.  It owns 80% stake in the power station operator company— Qatrana Electric Power Company—while rest (20%) is owned by Xenel Industries.

See also
Al-Qatraneh district
Qatraneh town
Qasr al-Qatraneh, fortified khan (inn) along the hajj route

References

Natural gas-fired power stations in Jordan